Chila is a mountain in the Chila mountain range in the Andes of Peru, about  high. It is located in the Arequipa Region, Castilla Province, on the border of the districts of Chachas and Choco. Chila lies north of Chuqi Pirwa.

See also 
 Q'asiri
 Sirani
 Yuraq Q'asa

References 

Mountains of Peru
Mountains of Arequipa Region